Tyrone Jefferson (born July 5, 1953) is an American trombonist, composer, arranger and producer. Over the course of his career he has collaborated with acts such as James Brown, Public Enemy, LL Cool J and others.

Early life and education
Tyrone Jefferson was born on July 5, 1953, in Manhattan. At a young age, his family relocated to Charlotte, North Carolina, where his interest in jazz began. After starting junior high school, he started to play the piano then the trombone.

Jefferson holds a B.S. in Electrical Engineering from North Carolina Agricultural and Technical State University, an M.S. in Management Information Systems from Pace University and a Professional Certificate in Arranging and Composition from Berklee College of Music.

Career
In high school Jefferson led his own band, which included a trumpet player, tuba player, tenor saxophonist, and three percussionists. During this time he also experimented with songwriting and arranging for several instruments.

In the early 1970s Jefferson joined the Army and completed a three-year tour in Kaiserslautern, Germany where he would ultimately meet saxophonist Norwood "Pony" Poindexter. Poindexter would later invite Jefferson to join him as a trombonist during his Sunday sessions at a Frankfurt club. Jefferson developed his musical skills as he began working with a number of German bands across several genres.

Upon his return to the United States, Jefferson began arranging live jazz sets at Damian's in Augusta, Georgia. These sets were named sittin' in and helped solidify his place in the local jazz scene. In 1976 he was given a chance by percussionist Johnny Griggs, to join James Brown on tour as director of his band, The J.B.'s. After his participation in the tour ended, he went on to collaborate with dozens of musicians, including James Brown, rappers Public Enemy, hip-hop artist L.L. Cool J and Gospel artist Heather Headley. He has performed in Argentina, Brazil, Canada, Europe, Japan, Morocco and the Caribbean, and at venues such as the Apollo Theater, Lincoln Center, Greek Theatre and the Staples Center.

Jefferson also joined Frank Foster's jazz ensemble Living Color: 10 Shades of Black as well as Slide Hampton's World of Trombones. His work as a trombonist, songwriter, and composer and his dedication to African American history and culture has led to profiles in Carib magazine, Black Elegance, Sister-to-Sister, Charlotte Magazine and Jet magazine. Jefferson was among the composers commissioned by the French Minister of Culture to write A Hymn for World Peace in 1984. He is also featured in Digging: The Afro-American Soul of American Classical Music by Amiri Baraka (2009).

Activism and awards
Jefferson currently acts as executive director of A Sign of the Times of the Carolinas, a non- profit organization focused on reaching out to the community through music and educational programs that reflect the heritage of African Americans. In 2013 he was the recipient of the Harvey B. Gantt Center award.

Discography
Alex Bugnon – Head Over Heels (1990) – Trombone
James Spaulding – Songs of Courage (Muse, 1991 [1993]) – Trombone
Errol Parker – Errol Parker (1991) – Trombone
Public Enemy – Apocalypse 91...The Enemy Strikes Black (1991) – Horns
Pee Wee Ellis – Blues Mission (1992) – Trombone
Errol Parker – Remembering Billy Strayhorn (1994) – Trombone
James Brown – Live at the Apollo (1995) – Trombone
Mark Ledford – Miles 2 Go (1998) – Trombone
James Brown – Dead on the Heavy Funk (1975–1983) 1998 – Trombone
Heather Headley – Audience of One (2009) – Trombone, Horn Arrangements

Personal life
Jefferson currently lives in Charlotte with his wife Toni. They both host the weekly Saturday Night R&B House Party on Gaston College Radio and act as the producers of The State of Black Music on public access TV. He has three children and two grandchildren.

References

External links
A Sign of the Times of the Carolinas

1953 births
African-American jazz composers
People from Manhattan
Musicians from Charlotte, North Carolina
Living people
The J.B.'s members
Jazz musicians from New York (state)
Jazz musicians from North Carolina
American jazz trombonists
Male trombonists
20th-century jazz composers
20th-century trombonists
20th-century American musicians
20th-century American male musicians
21st-century jazz composers
21st-century trombonists
21st-century American musicians
21st-century American male musicians
North Carolina A&T State University alumni
Pace University alumni
American male jazz composers
American jazz composers